Dr. Jekyll and Mr. Hyde is a 1941 American horror film starring Spencer Tracy, Ingrid Bergman, and Lana Turner. The production also features Donald Crisp, Ian Hunter, Barton MacLane, C. Aubrey Smith, and Sara Allgood. Its storyline is based on the 1886 Gothic novella Strange Case of Dr Jekyll and Mr Hyde written by Scottish author Robert Louis Stevenson. There have been many filmed adaptations of the novella. This movie was a remake of the Oscar-winning 1931 version starring Fredric March.

Released in August 1941, Dr. Jekyll and Mr. Hyde was a commercial success, and was nominated for three Academy Awards.

Plot
In 1887 London, Dr. Henry Jekyll is performing research experiments on the possibility of separating the good and evil aspects of human nature. Jekyll is in love with Beatrix Emery, but her father, Sir Charles, is skeptical of Jekyll's radical ideas. Jekyll develops a serum that he attempts to use on Sam Higgins, a patient who went insane after suffering a gas works explosion, but the plan fails when Jekyll learns Sam has died. Instead, Jekyll impulsively takes the serum himself, and is transformed in mindset and countenance into a malevolent alter ego. Jekyll takes an antidote to reverse the serum's effects, but not before experience an auditory hallucination in which a voice speaks: "Mr. Hyde."

Beatrix departs England on a trip abroad with her father, who is concerned about the love affair between the two, leaving Jekyll alone. When Beatrix's father extends Marcia's time away from London, Jekyll continues to experiment with the serum, ingesting another dose. In his alter ego of Mr. Hyde, he ventures into a music hall where he spots attractive barmaid Ivy Peterson, whom he saved from an attacker in the streets some weeks before. Because his face and manner is disfigured by the evil brought out by the serum, Ivy does not recognize him, and becomes frightened when approaching his table. Hyde surreptitiously instigates mayhem in the music hall, tripping one man, hitting another with a cane, poking another in the eye, pitting one patron against another until a brawl ensues, after which Hyde convinces the owner that Ivy was the cause of the trouble, and bribes the hall owner to fire her. Hyde takes a reluctant Ivy home with him, and rapes her in the carriage.

While Beatrix grows concerned after receiving no correspondence, Hyde provides Ivy housing in a flat, although she lives in fear of Hyde's psychological manipulation and violent behavior. When Ivy's friend Marcia visits her, Marcia see bruises on Ivy's back and suspects Ivy is being abused, but before she can find out what is going on, Hyde appears and menaces Marcia, who leaves in a hurry; afterward, Hyde taunts Ivy that Marcia is more beautiful than Ivy, and he may leave Ivy to pursue Marcia, before subsequently tormenting Ivy by forcing her to sing against her will as a prelude to raping her.

Upon learning that Beatrix has returned to England, Jekyll vows not to take the serum again. He sends Ivy an anonymous gift of money before destroying the key to the street entrance of his laboratory, the entrance that he had been using while under the influence of Hyde. Later, Ivy visits Jekyll as a patient, and recognizes him as the man who helped her in the street. When she shows him her injuries and he realizes what Hyde has done to her, Jekyll is ashamed.

Later that night, as Jekyll ventures to meet Beatrix, who has returned to England, he unexpectedly transforms into Hyde without having ingested the serum. Hyde instead ventures to Ivy's flat and finds her drunk and celebrating her freedom from him. When Hyde repeats phrases that Jekyll spoke to her, she grows terrified and begins screaming, resulting in Hyde strangling her to death. Hyde flees to the laboratory, but cannot enter as Jekyll destroyed the key; instead, Hyde visits Dr. John Lanyon, a friend of Jekyll. Lanyon provides him the medication that works as the antidote, and Hyde reverts back to Jekyll, much to Lanyon's horror.

Jekyll confesses to Lanyon everything that has transpired, and proceeds to visit Beatrix to end their engagement. Beatrix is distraught by the incident, and is horrified when he returns transformed as Hyde. Beatrix screams before losing consciousness. Her father, roused by Beatrix's scream, enters the room, only to be bludgeoned to death by Hyde with Jekyll's cane. Hyde flees back to the laboratory, and, unable to enter through the street door, pushes past Jekyll's butler, Poole. Meanwhile, as police investigate Sir Charles's body, Lanyon arrives and observes that Jekyll's cane was the murder weapon. Realizing Jekyll committed the crime while in his alter ego state as Mr. Hyde, Lanyon convinces police to accompany him to Jekyll's home.

Lanyon and the authorities arrive at Jekyll's home moments after Hyde has ingested the antidote and turned back into Jekyll. Breaking down the door to the laboratory, they confront him about Sir Charles's murder. The psychological stress of the situation triggers Jekyll into returning back into Mr. Hyde, and he becomes violent. While attempting to fight police, Hyde is shot by Lanyon. As he dies, his demeanor and countenance slowly morphs back into that of Jekyll.

Cast

Analysis
Scholar Angela Smith writes that the film does not depict a significant physical difference between Jekyll and Hyde, suggesting that, unlike in other iterations of the story, the film places "greater emphasis on the psychological and neurological elements of physical disorders and testifies to the unreliability of the bodily exterior as a sign of health or degeneracy." She further cites that the hallucinatory sequences in the film featuring both Ivy and Beatrix (which occur when Jekyll ingests the serum) "conflate epileptic and sexual release, pointing to repressed sexual desires as the source of individual malaise." Smith summarizes that the film's treatment of the source material "suggests the complex network of physiology, neurology, psychology, sexuality, and environment that is shaped in the relationship between impairment and medicine."

Production

Development
Rather than being a new film version of Robert Louis Stevenson's novella, this Dr. Jekyll and Mr. Hyde is a direct remake of the 1931 film of the same title. Both Hollywood productions differ greatly from the original literary work due to their heavy reliance on Thomas Russell Sullivan's 1887 stage adaptation of the story. The director for the 1941 film was Victor Fleming, who had directed Gone with the Wind and codirected The Wizard of Oz, two major releases by Metro-Goldwyn-Mayer in 1939. MGM, where Fleming was under contract, acquired full rights to the 1931 film from Paramount Pictures prior to Fleming's production. According to the Robert Louis Stevenson website being archived and preserved by the British Library, subsequent to that acquisition MGM studio executives “hid the [1931] film away to avoid competition with their remake”. The Oscar-winning 1931 version then, due to ongoing legal restrictions and the lack of readily available copies, was effectively “lost” for over a quarter of a century, not generally available again for re-screenings and study until 1967.

MGM's 1941 remake was produced by Victor Saville and adapted by John Lee Mahin from the screenplay of the earlier film by Percy Heath and Samuel Hoffenstein. The score was composed by Franz Waxman with uncredited contributions by Daniele Amfitheatrof and Mario Castelnuovo-Tedesco. The cinematographer was Joseph Ruttenberg, the art director was Cedric Gibbons, and the costume designers were Adrian and Gile Steele. Jack Dawn created the make-up for the dissolute Mr. Hyde's appearance.

The PCA was very specific in characterizing Ivy as a barmaid rather than a prostitute, as she is characterized in the source material.

Casting
Despite having not yet met his later co-star Katharine Hepburn (they met working on Woman of the Year in 1942), Tracy originally wanted her to play both Bergman's and Turner's roles as the "bad" and "good" woman, who would then turn out to be the same person.

Initial casting had Bergman playing the virtuous fiancée of Jekyll and Turner as Ivy. However, Bergman, tired of playing saintly characters and fearing typecasting, pleaded with Victor Fleming that she and Turner switch roles. After a screen test, Fleming allowed Bergman to play a grittier role for the first time.

Release

Box office
According to MGM records the film earned $2,351,000 resulting in a profit of $350,000.

Critical reception
After its preview of Dr. Jekyll and Mr. Hyde in late July 1941, the trade paper Variety cited some weaknesses in the development of characters and situations in the film's plot; but, overall, the popular New York publication gave the production a very positive assessment. Variety predicted the film would be “one of the big ones for fall release” and focused special attention on Bergman's performance and screen presence. It compared too Hyde's physical appearance with his portrayals in the 1925 and 1931 interpretations of Stevenson's novella:
The Film Daily praised the film in its review, heaping most of its accolades on Victor Fleming and his direction. The trade paper, which was widely read by theater owners or “exhibitors”, complimented Fleming's pacing and staging of the story and described his “handling of the players” as “flawless”.

Outside the realm of film-industry trade papers, the general public in 1941 had more mixed reviews about Dr. Jekyll and Mr. Hyde. One example of those reactions can be found in the contemporary fan magazine Hollywood, which was distributed nationally each month by Fawcett Publications in Louisville, Kentucky. Hollywood recommended that its readership “should see the picture”, citing once again Bergman's excellent, “breath-taking” portrayal of Ivy. The monthly did, though, find the film's plot passé and Tracy's Hyde far too understated in appearance to be effective: Another fan-based publication, Modern Screen, was less subtle in its November 1941 review of Dr. Jekyll and Mr. Hyde, calling the film “quite the oddest picture of the year”. The magazine, in part, considered the remake “funniest when apparently it is trying to be most serious and never so routine as when it is trying hardest to be different.”

With regard to more recent critical responses to this version of Dr. Jekyll and Mr. Hyde, American film reviewer and historian Leonard Maltin in 2014 gave the production 3 out of a possible 4 stars, praising in particular Tracy and Bergman's performances. General audience reactions to Dr. Jekyll and Mr. Hyde were slightly higher on Rotten Tomatoes in approvals, scoring at 60% and registering a rating average of 3.5/5 based on over 2,500 responses.

Home media 
Warner Bros. released 1941 version on DVD in May 22, 2018 and Blu-ray in May 17, 2022.

Awards and honors

In 2005, the film was nominated by the American Film Institute to “AFI's 100 Years of Film Scores”.

References

Sources

External links

 
 
 
 
 

1941 horror films
1941 films
1940s English-language films
1940s historical horror films
1940s science fiction horror films
American historical horror films
American science fiction horror films
American supernatural horror films
American black-and-white films
Dr. Jekyll and Mr. Hyde films
Films produced by Victor Saville
Films scored by Franz Waxman
Films set in London
Films directed by Victor Fleming
Films based on horror novels
Horror film remakes
Metro-Goldwyn-Mayer films
Remakes of American films
Films set in 1887
1940s American films